Tropicamide/hydroxyamfetamine (trade name Paremyd) is a combination drug used as an ophthalmic solution to induce mydriasis.  It consists of:

Tropicamide (0.25%), an anticholinergic drug
Hydroxyamfetamine (norpholedrine, 1%), a sympathomimetic drug

References

Combination drugs
Ophthalmology drugs